King Hui of Wei (400–319 BC), originally called Marquis Hui of Wei, and after 344, King Hui of Liang was the third ruler of the state of Wei during the Warring States period, ruling from approximately 369–319 BC. He was a grandson of Marquess Wen of Wei, the founder of the state, and a son of Marquess Wu of Wei. He was succeeded by his son, King Xiang of Wei.

He came to the throne after a war of succession during which his state was nearly partitioned by Zhao and Han. For his wars and eventual defeat by Qi and Qin in 340, see Warring States period.

He is notable for four policies:
 In 361, he moved the capital from Anyi to Daliang to get it out of the reach of Qin. Anyi was on the plateau south of the Fen River not far from where the Fen River and Wei River join the Yellow River. Daliang was to the far southeast of the state near the border with Song. Thereafter, the state was briefly called Liang.
 in 362-359, he made exchanges of territory with Zhao to the north and Han to the south. This gave Wei more rational borders, secured the new capital and gave Wei more control over trade routes.
 In 361-355, he held several face-to-face meetings with the rulers of the neighboring states.
 In 344, he promoted himself from Marquis (hou), calling himself "King Hui of Liang".

He also conducted several dialogues with the renowned Confucian Mencius.

References

Bibliography
 
 

Monarchs of Wei (state)
Zhou dynasty nobility
4th-century BC Chinese monarchs